The following is a list of middle schools in Albuquerque, New Mexico.

 Albuquerque Academy
 Albuquerque Institute for Mathematics and Science
 Cleveland Middle School
 Cottonwood Classical Preparatory School
 Desert Ridge Middle School
 Eisenhower Middle School
 Ernie Pyle Middle School
 Garfield Middle School
 Grant Middle School
 Harrison Middle School
 Hayes Middle School
 Hoover Middle School
 Jackson Middle School
 James Monroe Middle School
 Jefferson Middle School
 Jimmy Carter Middle School
 John Adams Middle School
 Kennedy Middle School
 L. B. Johnson Middle School
 Madison Middle School
 McKinley Middle School
 Polk Middle School
 Roosevelt Middle School
 Sandia Preparatory School
 Taft Middle School
 Taylor Middle School
 Tony Hillerman Middle School
 Truman Middle School
 Van Buren Middle School
 Washington Middle School
2021 Washington Middle School Shooting
 Wilson Middle School

Albuquerque
Albuquerque